Rogoźna is a district in the south-west of Żory, Silesian Voivodeship, southern Poland.

History 
Rogoźna was first mentioned in a Latin document of Diocese of Wrocław called Liber fundationis episcopatus Vratislaviensis from around 1305 as item in Rogosina in una parte decima solvitur more polonico, valet fertonem, in alia parte [que] locatur iure theuthonico habet libertatem.

After World War I in the Upper Silesia plebiscite 240 out of 292 voters in Rogoźna voted in favour of joining Poland, against 49 opting for staying in Germany.

References

Neighbourhoods in Silesian Voivodeship
Żory